As of October 2022, 73 aircraft are in airline service, 31 BAe 146 and 42 Avro RJ. 31 in Asia, 23 in the Americas, 16 in Australia, 2 in Africa and 1 in Europe 
 14: Mahan Air
 12: Pionair Australia
 10: Aerovías DAP
 7: Summit Air
5: Air Libya
5: Qeshm Airlines
4: EcoJet
4: National Jet Express
4: SkyJet Airlines
2: Cronos Airlines
2: North Cariboo Air
2: TezJet Airlines 
1: Avia Bravo
1: Royal Air Philippines

Civil operators

Former operators are included on the following list.

Albanian Airlines - ceased operations

Armenia Airways - former operator

Australian airExpress - ceased operations

 Australian Airlink - ceased operations
National Jet Express, formerly Cobham Aviation Services Australia
Norfolk Jet Express - ceased operations
Pionair Australia
TNT - ceased operations

Brussels Airlines - former operator
Delta Air Transport - former operator
SABENA - former operator
SN Brussels Airlines - former operator
TNT Airways - former operator
→ASL Airlines Belgium

Aerosur - ceased operations
EcoJet
TAM - ceased operations

Air Botswana - former operator

Air Brasil - former operator
TABA – Transportes Aéreos da Bacia Amazônica - former operator

Avia Bravo
Bulgaria Air - former operator
Hemus Air - ceased operations

Air Atlantic - former operator
Air BC - former operator
Air Canada Jazz - former operator
Air Nova - former operator
Air Spray - currently flies converted BAe 146-200 aircraft as aerial firefighting air tankers.
Conair Group - currently flies converted Avro RJ85 aircraft as aerial firefighting air tankers.
First Air - former operator (Avro RJ85)
North Cariboo Air - current operator of RJ100 aircraft.(2)
Summit Air - current operator of Avro RJ85 and RJ100 aircraft

Aerovías DAP
LAN-Chile - former operator
→ LATAM Chile

CAAC Airlines - former operator
→Air China - former operator
→China Eastern Airlines - former operator
→China Northwest Airlines→China Eastern Airlines - former operator

SAM - former operator

Korongo Airlines - former operator

Air Djibouti - former operator

Sol Dominicana Airlines - ceased operations

Cronos Airlines

Atlantic Airways - former operator

Eurowings - former operator
Lufthansa CityLine - former operator
WDL Aviation
→German Regional Airlines

Starbow Airlines - ceased operations

Aegean Airlines - former operator
Astra Airlines - former operator, ceased operations
Ellinair - former operator, ceased operations

TNT Malev Express - ceased operations

Aviastar Mandiri
National Air Charter - former operator
Penas Air - ceased operations

MDLR Airlines - ceased operations

Mahan Air
Qeshm Air
Taban Air - former operator

Aer Lingus - former operator
CityJet - former operator

Manx Airlines - former operator, ceased operations

Air Dolomiti - former operator
Alisarda - former operator; ceased operations
Meridiana - former operator; ceased operations
Sagittair - ceased operations

TezJet

Air Libya

efly - ceased operations

Heritage Air (Melaka) - ceased operations

 Eznis Airways - former operator

Air National - former operator, ceased flight operations
Ansett New Zealand, later Qantas New Zealand - former operator, ceased operations
Mount Cook Airlines - former operator
Vincent Aviation - ceased operations

Star Peru - former operator

Asian Spirit - former operator
Royal Air Philippines
SkyJet Airlines

Makung Airlines (now known as Uni Air) - former operator

Aviro Air - ceased operations
Romavia - former operator, ceased operations

Airlink - former operator

Centavia - ceased operations

Meridiana Air - former operator
Orion Air - former operator
Pan Air - former operator
→ASL Airlines Spain - former operator, ceased operations

Malmö Aviation / BRA Braathens Regional Airlines - ceased RJ operations in March 2020.
Transwede Airways - former operator, ceased operations in 2010.

Crossair - ceased operations
Swiss Global Air Lines - former operator

 Thai Airways - former operator

 Turkish Airlines - former operator

 AirUK - former operator
 British Airways - former operator
 British Caribbean Airways (British Virgin Islands) - former operator
 Capital Airlines - former operator
 Cello Aviation - former operator, ceased operations
 Dan-Air - former operator
Debonair - former operator
Flightline - ceased operations
 Flybe - former operator, ceased operations
 Jota Aviation - former operator
 Loganair - former operator
 Titan Airways - former operator

 AeroFlite - converted BAe 146 aircraft as aerial firefighting air tankers.
 AirCal - former operator
 AirPac - former operator (in Alaska)
 Air Spray - converted BAe 146 aircraft as aerial firefighting air tankers.
 Air Wisconsin (operating as United Express) - former operator of BAe 146-100, 146-200 and 146-300 aircraft. Only U.S. operator of BAe 146-300.
 American Airlines - former operator (ex-AirCal aircraft)
 Aspen Airways - former BAe 146-100 operator (acquired by Air Wisconsin)
 Atlantic Southeast Airlines (ASA) (operating as Delta Connection) - former operator of the BAe 146-200.
 Business Express (operating as Delta Connection and Northwest Jetlink) - former operator of BAe 146-200 and Avro RJ70 aircraft
 Continental Express (operated by Presidential Airways) - former operator
 Discovery Airways - former operator
 Empire Airlines - former operator
 Mesaba Airlines (operating as Northwest Jetlink) - former Avro RJ85 operator
 Minden Air Corporation - converted BAe 146 aircraft as an aerial firefighting air tanker.
 Neptune Aviation - currently flies 9 converted BAe 146 aircraft as aerial firefighting air tankers.
 Pacific Southwest Airlines (PSA) - former operator; fleet included aircraft previously ordered by Pacific Express but not delivered.
 Pan Am Express - former BAe 146-100; 146-200 operators (all later acquired by Air Wisconsin)
 Presidential Airways - former operator
 Royal West Airlines - former operator
 TriStar Airlines - former operator
 USAir (became US Airways, which merged with American Airlines) - former operator (ex-PSA aircraft)
 WestAir, operating as United Express - former operator

 UM Airlines - former operator; ceased operations

Uzbekistan Airways - former operator

 Air Zimbabwe - former operator

Military and government operators

Government of Austria - (never flown)

Royal Bahraini Air Force - used as Royal Flight

Bolivian Air Force - former operator

Ministry of State Secretariat - Presidential aircraft. The aircraft are owned and operated by Pelita Air

Free Libyan Air Force - former operator

Government of Mali - former operator

Nepalese Army Air Service - former operator

Royal Saudi Air Force - former operator

Dubai Air Wing
United Arab Emirates Government

Facility for Airborne Atmospheric Measurements
Royal Air Force
No. 32 (The Royal) Squadron RAF (former operator)

Air Force of Zimbabwe - No. 3 Squadron (former operator)

Corporate operators
The BAe 146 has also been flown by corporate operators.

References

Hawker Siddeley
BAe 146